Mercy is an American pop group from Florida. The group's 1969 single "Love (Can Make You Happy)", written by Jack Sigler, Jr., soared to No. 2 on the U.S. Billboard Hot 100 singles chart, and also peaked at No. 2 on the Adult Contemporary chart. "Love (Can Make You Happy)" was released in April and had sold over one million copies by July 15, earning a gold record from the R.I.A.A., although the group did not receive the award until October 2009.

The track was originally released on the small Tampa, Florida-based Sundi record label, at which time it was also included in the movie, Fireball Jungle. The B-side of the Sundi single was entitled "Fire Ball".

During the single's rapid rise in the charts, an album was released by a group calling themselves "The Mercy" (with a cover showing three girls), that included the Sundi recording, as well as several other songs that were not recorded by any of the original Mercy members.

The song was re-recorded on the Warner Brothers label, with the addition of new band members, and included on the Warner Brothers album, Love Can Make You Happy, which peaked at No. 38 on the U.S. Billboard 200 chart. Mercy had one other Billboard Hot 100 hit, the song "Forever", which reached No. 79 in June 1969.

The band is still touring with Sigler, the original lead vocalist and founder of the group. Mercy released their latest EP on iTunes in 2009.

Discography

Albums

Singles

Members
Current Touring Members
Jack Sigler, Jr.
Suzanne Sigler
Butch Darby
Kevin Dennis

Touring Members - Warner Bros. Recording
Jack Sigler, Jr. 
Ronnie Caudill
Buddy Good
Debbie Lewis
Brenda McNish
James Marvell
Roger Fuentes

Original Members - Sundi Recording
Jack Sigler, Jr.
Ann Sigler
John Hudson
Roy Shultz
Brenda McNish
Debbie Lewis
Ronnie Caudill
Lou Facenda
Deni Hawley

See also
List of one-hit wonders in the United States

References

Musical groups from Florida
Jamie Records artists
Sunshine pop